Juan "Johnny" Ledesma Manahan (born 11 February 1947), also known as Mr. M, is a Filipino film and television director, actor, talent manager, and screenwriter.

He is known for managing actors, being the manager for ABS-CBN's Star Magic (formerly the Talent Center), as well as the former senior vice-president of ABS-CBN.

Early life and education
Manahan was born on February 11, 1947, in Bacolod, Negros Occidental, Philippines. His parents were Dr. Constantino Perez Manahan and Elvira Ledesma Manahan, a socialite and television host (Two for the Road). Manahan attended high school at the Ateneo de Manila in 1964, and finished his studies at the University of California, Berkeley, AB Art History, in 1969.

Before becoming a director-manager, Manahan was a visual artist, painter, and sculptor. He received the "Special Citation" award at the Paris Biennale of Art in 1979.

Career
Manahan began his career directing for television soon after his studies around 1971. He was a freelancer and directed shows for the various local channels such as Two for the Road (GMA), For the Boys (IBC), The Big Big Show (BBC/City2), and Kaluskos Musmos (RPN). Right after ABS-CBN re-opened in 1986, he was appointed as a resident director at the network. He directed the leading shows of the history of local television, such as Chika Chika Chicks, Palibhasa Lalake, Tonight with Dick and Carmi, Abangan Ang Susunod Na Kabanata, and I Am What I Am.

In April 1992, Manahan, then the program director, and Freddie Garcia, then ABS-CBN executive vice president and general manager, formed the idea of creating a stable of new stars exclusively for the network. This gave birth to Talent Center. In its early years, the Talent Center's project was Ang TV. The show auditioned thousands of people and accepted chosen ones into the program. The series soon led to mall shows, live concerts, and record albums. It also became a springboard for the careers of Claudine Barretto, Jolina Magdangal, Camille Prats, Victor Neri, and Paolo Contis among others. The Talent Center continued its search through the launching vehicle Star Circle in 1995.

While he was busy discovering and developing new talent, Manahan continued to direct television shows, movies, concerts, and specials. In particular, he directed the first collaboration of Martin Nievera and Gary Valenciano, a major concert in September 2009 at the Mall of Asia concert grounds, as well as concerts of international singers Barry Manilow, Diana Krall and Andrea Bocelli in the Philippines.

He is the man behind the television coverage of the Miss Earth pageants, the Christmas and anniversary specials of ABS-CBN, celebrity weddings and debut specials, election specials, and many more. In addition, he also managed the grand world tours and concerts outside the country which includes ASAP '05 in the U.S. and Japan, Wowowee in Las Vegas, Chicago and Hawaii, and the Star Magic World Tour in Canada and the U.S., among others.

Manahan held various positions in ABS-CBN management. He was the Director in the Talent Center (1992-1994); Program Director in the Production Department (1994-1996); and Vice President in the Talent Development & Management Center (1996-2003); Senior Vice President of ABS-CBN's Star Magic (2003-2007). He retired in 2007 but remained as Head and Consultant of Star Magic until 2020.

In 2020, following the closure of ABS-CBN for not having its franchise renewed by the congress and National Telecommunications Commission, Manahan signed up as Production Consultant with Brightlight Productions, an independent company owned by former Negros Occidental 3rd District Rep. Albee Benitez. Brightlight Productions secured a blocktime agreement with TV5, allowing Manahan to handle two variety shows: the daily noontime show Lunch Out Loud and the now-defunct Sunday noontime musical variety show Sunday Noontime Live!. Following his departure, Joane Laygo, who was an assistant director in ASAP, replaced Manahan as the director of ASAP.

Manahan joined GMA Artist Center as a consultant in July 2021.

Legacy
Manahan was a mentor to a number of people who went on to become well-known in show business in the Philippines; among these are Star Magic talents Piolo Pascual, Claudine Barretto, Angelica Panganiban, Diether Ocampo, Bea Alonzo, Kim Chiu, Gerald Anderson and John Lloyd Cruz

Filmography

Pre-resident director
from 1971-1986

As Director
Love Me From What I Am: Maricel Soriano (BBC-2 / 1985)
The Big, Big Show (BBC-2)
Mana (BBC-2)
2+2 (BBC-2)
Julian Talisman (RPN 9)
Kaluskos Musmos (RPN 9)
Alab ng Lahi (RPN 9)
Model (RPN 9)
Musmos Pa Si Boss (IBC 13)
For the Boys (IBC 13)

As Guest DirectorTwo for the Road (GMA 7)In the Money (IBC 13)Mga Kwento Ni Lola (RPN 9)Dina (BBC 2)Late Hour with June & Johnny (GMA 7)Love Me For What I Am: Maricel Soriano'' (BBC-2)

As a director
Film

Television series

Variety shows

Specials

As an actor
Film

As a writer
Works

Awards

References

External links
 
 GMA Network profile

1947 births
Filipino film directors
Filipino television directors
Filipino male film actors
Living people
ABS-CBN executives
 
GMA Network (company) executives
University of California, Berkeley alumni
People from Bacolod
Actors from Negros Occidental
Filipino screenwriters